Lenah Jemutai Cheruiyot (born 1 March 1973) is a Kenyan former long-distance runner who competed mainly in road running competitions. Her highest international honour was a team gold medal at the IAAF World Half Marathon Championships in 2002, which she shared for finishing seventh. She competed up to the marathon distance and set a best of 2:26:00 hours for that event at the 2008 Paris Marathon, at which she was placed third.

Although her international career was limited, she competed extensively on the professional road circuit and won many high calibre races, including: the Venice Marathon (twice), the Humarathon, Lille Half Marathon, Paris Half Marathon (twice), Porto Half Marathon, CPC Loop Den Haag, and 20 Kilomètres de Paris. She had 41 career victories in distance running.

International competitions

Circuit wins
Venice Marathon: 2006, 2007
Humarathon: 2004
Lille Half Marathon: 2004
Paris Half Marathon: 2005, 2008
Porto Half Marathon: 2007
CPC Loop Den Haag: 2002
20 Kilomètres de Paris: 2004
Würzburger Residenzlauf: 2002, 2001
Paderborner Osterlauf: 2002
Parelloop: 2002
Breda Singelloop: 2001
Lotto Crosscup de Hannut: 2003
Sylvestercross: 2002

Personal bests
5000 metres – 15:44.54 min (2001)
10K run – 31:21 min (2002)
Half marathon – 68:54 min (2002)
Marathon – 2:26:00 (2008)

References

External links

Living people
1973 births
Kenyan female long-distance runners
Kenyan female marathon runners